J. D. Schwalm is an American special effects artist. He won an Academy Award in the category Best Visual Effects for the film First Man.

Selected filmography 
 First Man (2018; co-won with Paul Lambert, Ian Hunter and Tristan Myles)

References

External links 

Living people
Place of birth missing (living people)
Year of birth missing (living people)
Special effects people
Special effects coordinators
Best Visual Effects Academy Award winners